Demise of the Crown Act may refer to

 Demise of the Crown Act 1702, Act of the Parliament of England
 Demise of the Crown Act 1727, Act of the Parliament of Great Britain
 Demise of the Crown Act 1901, Act of the Parliament of the United Kingdom